Denbigh High School  (formerly known  as Denbigh Junior Secondary School, Denbigh Secondary School and Denbigh Comprehensive High School) is a high school in Clarendon, Denbigh, Jamaica. founded in 1969, seven years after Jamaican independence

Overview

Denbigh High School began in 1969 as Denbigh Secondary School with 810 students, drawn from three feeder schools: York Town, Four Paths and Denbigh Primary. Arthur Garson Bryant and Sylvester Bryan served as Principal and Vice Principal respectively. In 1996, the school broadened its reach by introducing tertiary education.

References

The Principal is currently Mrs Janice Julal (2016–Present)

High schools in Jamaica
Buildings and structures in Manchester Parish